Pentalofos is a village and a former community in Kozani regional unit, West Macedonia, Greece. Since the 2011 local government reform it is part of the municipality Voio, of which it is a municipal unit. It is located at 1060 meters elevation to the base of mountain Voio. The municipal unit has an area of 83.923 km2, the community 38.113 km2. The population of the municipal unit was 620 people, while the population of the community itself was 446 people as of 2011.

References

External links
Site of the former community of Pentalofos

Populated places in Kozani (regional unit)
Former municipalities in Western Macedonia